Rodney "Don Vito" Richard (born July 9, 1978) is an American record producer. He is best known as the producer who collaborated with Kandi Burruss on projects portrayed on The Real Housewives of Atlanta, including Kim Zolciak's breakout single "Tardy for the Party". He also worked as a judge on The Kandi Factory airing on Bravo, and as executive producer for Burruss' weekly webisode series Kandi Koated Nights.

Personal life 
Don Vito was born on July 9, 1978, in Gary, Indiana to Louis and Juanita Richard. While in high school, he learned the art of DJing and would perform at school dances and local house parties. After being discharged from the Marine Corps, Vito moved to Atlanta, Georgia.

On August 21, 2013, Don Vito and his girlfriend, LaTavia Roberson, formerly of Destiny's Child, welcomed a daughter named Lyric. The pair welcomed son Londyn on September 23, 2019.

Music career 
Vito was introduced to record producer, DJ Cooley C, who gave him the opportunity to work with hip hop artists Ghetto Mafia and Kilo. He later met Ian Burke who introduced him to rapper Solé, signed to RedZone Entertainment. Tricky Stewart then signed him to Redzone, and he started working with Solé and artists such as Mya and Blu Cantrell. Less than four years later, Don Vito ventured out with R&B group Cherish. In 2005, he launched Don Vito Productions, a music and video production company.

Discography

Credits

Singles

Awards and nominations 
 2010, BMI, Nomination Special Background Performance Cue
 2007, Songwriter Award, Cherish, Do It to It

See also 
 "Tardy for the Party" lawsuit

References

External links 

 Meet Superstar Producer Don Vito, Freddyo.com
 Real Housewife of Atlanta Kim Zolciak Being Sued By Music Producer, Radaronline.com
 Cast of Kandi Koated Nights, Straigftfromthea.com
 Yung Joc Album Review, XXL, xxlmag.com
 The One, Hip Hop MVP.com
 Soundcheck, Soultrain.com
 A&R, Learnthemusicindustry.com
 Don Vito Celebrity Judge, BET's 106 & Park
 The Kandi Factory is Worth Visiting, Kandi Factory

1978 births
Living people
African-American businesspeople
African-American record producers
African-American male rappers
20th-century African-American people
American male singers
African-American television personalities
American hip hop record producers
American music managers
American rhythm and blues keyboardists
A&R people
Businesspeople from Atlanta
Businesspeople from Indiana
Participants in American reality television series
Musicians from Gary, Indiana
Rappers from Atlanta
Rappers from Indiana
Songwriters from Georgia (U.S. state)
Southern hip hop musicians
Songwriters from Indiana
21st-century American rappers
21st-century American male musicians
African-American songwriters
21st-century African-American musicians
American male songwriters